Granville is an American pop band formed in Frederick, Maryland in May, 2005 as the band project of singer songwriter Brian Myers. It was originally made up of Brian Myers (singer-songwriter, vocals, guitar), Zak Mabie (bass, violin), Butch Burrows (lead guitar, pedal steel guitar), and Sam Stillwel (drums).  Brian was originally in The Brian Damage Band, Zak was in Magister Ludi, and Butch was in Miller Station. 

The name of the band is a tribute to Brian's great grandfather, Granville Elias Coppersmith. They play Americana roots-influenced music which crosses over in style from rock to pop to blues to country.

They became popular on radio and on the internet. Recording for Jug Bridge Music, they released their debut album Feather and Heart on November 26, 2005.  The single from the album "The Brightest Light" was a true crossover hit charting on Top 40, Adult Contemporary, College and Country radio. The band received two nominations for the 2006 New Music Awards and received the award for the best new band in the College category.

Brian Myers continued writing material for Granville from his home in Orange County, California and later released a sophomore record Golden State, performing the tracks as a multi-instrumentalist and without the original band lineup.

Discography

Albums
2005: Feather and Heart
2015: Golden State

Singles
2006: "The Brightest Light"

References

Musical groups from Maryland
Musical groups established in 2005